The 2023 Bury Metropolitan Borough Council elections are scheduled to take place on 4 May 2023 alongside other local elections across the United Kingdom. One third of seats (17) on Bury Metropolitan Borough Council are to be contested.

Background 
The Local Government Act 1972 created a two-tier system of metropolitan counties and districts covering Greater Manchester, Merseyside, South Yorkshire, Tyne and Wear, the West Midlands, and West Yorkshire starting in 1974. Bury was a district of the Greater Manchester metropolitan county. The Local Government Act 1985 abolished the metropolitan counties, with metropolitan districts taking on most of their powers as metropolitan boroughs. The Greater Manchester Combined Authority was created in 2011 and began electing the mayor of Greater Manchester from 2017, which was given strategic powers covering a region coterminous with the former Greater Manchester metropolitan county.

Since its formation, Bury has variously been under Labour control, Conservative control and no overall control. Councillors have predominantly been elected from the Labour Party and the Conservative Party, with some Liberal Democrat and independent councillors also serving. The council has had an overall Labour majority since the 2011 election.

In the most recent election in 2022, where all 51 seats were up for election due to boundary changes, Labour won 29 seats, the Conservatives won 12 seats, Radcliffe First won eight seats, and the Liberal Democrats and an independent won one seat each.

Electoral process 

The council generally elects its councillors in thirds, with a third being up for election every year for three years, with no election in the fourth year. The election will be conducted using the first-past-the-post voting system, with each ward electing one councillor.

All registered electors (British, Irish, Commonwealth and European Union citizens) living in Bury aged 18 or over were entitled to vote in the election. People who live at two addresses in different councils, such as university students with different term-time and holiday addresses, were entitled to be registered for and vote in elections in both local authorities. Voting in-person at polling stations took place from 07:00 to 22:00 on election day, and voters were able to apply for postal votes or proxy votes in advance of the election.

Council composition

Candidates 

Asterisks denote incumbent councillors seeking re-election.

Besses

Bury East

Bury West

Elton

Holyrood

Moorside

North Manor

Pilkington Park

Radcliffe East

Radcliffe North & Ainsworth

Radcliffe West

Ramsbottom

Redvales

St. Marys

Sedgley

Tottington

Unsworth

References 

Bury Council elections
Bury